Addition Creek is a stream in the U.S. state of Montana. It is a tributary to South Fork Flathead River.

According to tradition, Addition Creek was named in celebration of the wedding of forestry official Donald Bruce (namesake to Bruce Creek).

Course
Addition Creek rises at Bruce Mountain in Flathead County, Montana, and then flows northwest to join South Fork Flathead River about 0.25 miles southwest of Horse Ridge.

Watershed
Addition Creek drains  of area, receives about 54.3 in/year of precipitation, has a wetness index of 283.50, and is about 86% forested.

References

Rivers of Montana
Rivers of Flathead County, Montana